Ken Harper may refer to:

Ken Harper (footballer, born 1917) (1917–1994), English footballer for Bradford City
Ken Harper (footballer, born 1924) (1924–2010), English footballer for Shrewsbury Town
Kenneth Harper (1913–1998), English film producer
Kenneth F. Harper (born 1931), American politician in Kentucky
Kenneth Harper (cricketer), English cricketer